Tastebuddies was a late night show on BBC Choice UK that had started life as a 'straight', 'daytime TV' style studio-based cookery show on BBC Choice Wales presented by Rhian Williams . It soon after became a 10-minute section of a magazine show presented by Amy Charles, called "In Full View"  that was also shown on BBC Choice Wales. 
Following a change of director in 1999 (and dramatic reduction of budget) it became a series of low-budget, anarchic, "fly-on-the-wall" style comedy-cookery sketches in the 2nd and final series of In Full View, and the first 4 episodes of Sleeping Dogs. 
It was during the 2nd series of In Full View that these sketches were seen by the then new head of BBC Choice, Stuart Murphy.
He commissioned Tastebuddies for a 10 part series on BBC Choice UK in 2000.

Trivia
BBC News broadcaster Huw Edwards made a cameo appearance in the final episode.

Creative Cast & Crew
Some of the more technically able members of the cast role's crossed over with the crew's. Indeed, when not in a scene, actor Stephen Bush also assisted sound, lighting, wardrobe, location-scouting AND direction. Many of the cast were also musicians. For example, Simon, Colin, Alun and Janice sang and played in most of the episodes.

Cast
Simon Adams
Colin Bowen
Stephen Bush
 Sean Carlsen
Boyd Clack
Sally Collins
Steve Floyd
Tony Gabriel
Jim Kitson
Eleanor McRea
Janice Pugsley
Alun Roberts
Jan Wierszylowski
Rhian Williams original presenter

Crew
Tim Williamson – Writer and Director
Jon Rees – Lighting Cameraman
Adam Jones – Sound

External links
http://www.aspect-tv.com/programmes.htm#2000
http://www.madjanice.com
http://imdb.com/title/tt1124023/

BBC television comedy